Gil Suray (born 29 August 1984 in Anderlecht) is a Belgian professional road bicycle racer, who last rode for UCI Continental team Lotto-Bodysol.

Palmarès 

 Flèche Ardennaise (2006)

External links 

1984 births
Living people
Belgian male cyclists
People from Anderlecht
Cyclists from Brussels
21st-century Belgian people